The episodes of the Tokyo Mew Mew anime series are based on the manga series of the same name written by Reiko Yoshida and illustrated by Mia Ikumi. Directed by Noriyuki Abe and produced by Studio Pierrot, the episodes focus on five girls infused with the DNA of rare animals that gives them special powers and allows them to transform into "Mew Mews". Led by Ichigo Momomiya, the girls protect the earth from aliens who wish to "reclaim" it.

Broadcast on both TV Aichi and TV Tokyo, the series premiered on April 6, 2002 and aired weekly until its conclusion on March 29, 2003. 4Kids Entertainment licensed the first 26 episodes of the series for the English-dubbed release in North America in 2004. Their release, initially titled Hollywood Mew Mew, would be heavily edited and localized to the point that viewers would not recognize its Japanese origins. The series was later referred to as The Mew Mews and Tokyo Mew Mew in subsequent 4Kids press releases. 

The English dub premiered on 4Kids TV on February 19, 2005, under the name Mew Mew Power. As 4Kids had announced, the characters and episodes were renamed, scenes were cut, the original episode story lines were modified, and the music was replaced with a new score.  Twenty-three episodes of Mew Mew Power aired before the series was canceled after 4Kids was unable to acquire the license for the remaining twenty-six episodes of the series. All 26 episodes of Mew Mew Power aired in Canada on YTV in 2005, and in the United Kingdom on Pop Girl in 2008. Mew Mew Power was licensed for regional-language broadcast in France by Arès Films.

The episodes use two pieces of theme music: "My Sweet Heart", performed by Rika Komatsu for the opening theme, and "Koi wa A La Mode", performed by the five voice actors who played the Mew Mews, for the ending. In the Mew Mew Power English adaptation, the opening theme for the episodes is replaced with "Team Up", performed by Bree Sharp. Nine DVD compilations were released by Interchannel in Japan. Although Mew Mew Power has not been released to home video in North America, ten of the 4Kids episodes were released to Region 4 in North American on Warner Bros. Home Entertainment. Madman Entertainment DVD in Australia and New Zealand by Magna Pacific and all twenty-six dubbed episodes were released to Region 2 DVD in South Africa. Warner Home Vidéo France released nine episodes of the Arès Films dub of Mew Mew Power to DVD in a single DVD volume. The final 26 episodes were released in two DVD box sets in uncut, French dubbed format through AK Vidéo.


Episode list

Season 1

Season 2

Home media

Japanese

VHS

See also
List of Tokyo Mew Mew chapters
List of Tokyo Mew Mew characters
List of Tokyo Mew Mew New episodes

References

Tokyo Mew Mew